The North Hills is the northern suburbs of Pittsburgh, Pennsylvania.  The independent suburban municipalities that are included in the North Hills are Ross Township, Borough of West View, Shaler Township, West Deer Township, Franklin Park, Marshall Township, Bradford Woods, McCandless Township, Hampton Township, Pine Township, Richland Township, Borough of Fox Chapel, Indiana Township, O'Hara Township, Bellevue, Avalon, Reserve Township, Ohio Township, Kilbuck Township, Emsworth, Ben Avon, and Ben Avon Heights.

School Districts
North Allegheny School District
 Serving the townships of Marshall, McCandless, Franklin Park Borough and Bradford Woods Borough. 
Pine-Richland School District
 Serving the townships of Pine and Richland. 
Deer Lakes School District
 Serving the townships of West Deer, Frazer, and East Deer. 
Hampton Township School District
 Serving the township of Hampton. 
Fox Chapel Area School District
 Serving the townships of Indiana and O'Hara. Also serves Fox Chapel, Blawnox, Aspinwall, and Sharpsburg. 
Avonworth School District
 Serving the townships of Kilbuck and Ohio. Also serves Ben Avon, Ben Avon Heights, and Emsworth. 
North Hills School District
 Serving Ross Township and West View borough. 
Shaler Area School District
 Serving the townships of Shaler and Reserve. Also serves Millvale and Etna. 
Northgate School District
 Serving the areas of Bellevue and Avalon.

References

Regions of Pennsylvania
Geography of Pittsburgh